Princess Marie Armande de La Trémoille (Marie Armande Victoire; 1677 – 5 March 1717) was a French noblewoman and The Princess of Turenne by marriage.

Biography

The eldest of two children, her parents were Charles Belgique Hollande de La Trémoille, duc de Thouars, and Madeleine de Créquy. She was engaged to a distant cousin, Emmanuel Théodose de La Tour d'Auvergne (1668–1730), son and heir of Godefroy Maurice de La Tour d'Auvergne, Duke of Bouillon (1641–1721). Emmanuel Théodose's mother was Marie Anne Mancini, niece of Cardinal Mazarin.

As heir to the Duchy of Bouillon, her husband was styled prince de Turenne. The couple were married on 1 February 1696 in the chapel of the Hôtel de Crequi, Paris, the town house of her maternal grandfather. The couple had seven children, two of whom had further issue.

Through her father, she was a second cousin of the French regent Philippe, duc d'Orléans.

The princess de Turenne died in Paris at the Hôtel de Bouillon in Paris. Her husband went on to marry three more times; firstly in 1719 to Louise Françoise Angélique Le Tellier (died 1719) a grand daughter of Louvois; again in 1720 to  Anne Marie Christiane de Simiane (died 1722) and again in 1725 to Louise Henriette Françoise de Lorraine.

Issue

Armande de La Tour d'Auvergne (28 August 1697 – 13 April 1717) married Louis de Melun, Prince d'Epinoy, duc de Joyeuse (1694–1724).
Marie Madeleine de La Tour d'Auvergne (22 October 1698 – 25 September 1699) died in infancy.
X de La Tour d'Auvergne (28 December 1699 – 30 December 1699) died in infancy.
Godefroy Maurice de La Tour d'Auvergne (4 May 1701 – 9 January 1705); died in infancy.
Frédéric Maurice Casimir de La Tour d'Auvergne, prince de Turenne (24 October 1702 – 1 October 1723); married Maria Carolina Sobieski, daughter of James Louis Sobieski and sister of Maria Clementina Sobieski; died in an accident at Strassburg; no issue.
Marie Hortense Victoire de La Tour d'Auvergne (27 January 1704 – 1741); married Charles Armand René de La Trémoille and had issue.
Charles Godefroy de La Tour d'Auvergne, Duke of Bouillon (16 July 1706 – 24 October 1771); married his brother's widow, Maria Karolina Sobieski, and had issue.

Ancestry

References and notes

 http://www.heraldica.org/topics/france/bouillon.htm

1677 births
1717 deaths
House of La Trémoille
La Tour d'Auvergne
French duchesses
Princesses of Turenne
17th-century French people
18th-century French people
17th-century French women
18th-century French women
People of Byzantine descent